Armen Martirosyan (born 6 August 1969 in Leninakan, Shirak, Armenian SSR) is a retired Armenian triple jumper. He came in fifth place at the 1996 Summer Olympics and also competed at the 2000 Summer Olympics and 2004 Summer Olympics in the men's triple jump. Martirosyan won a bronze medal at the 1996 European Indoor Championships in Stockholm. His personal best triple jump is 17.41 metres, achieved in June 1998 in Gyumri. His personal best triple jump indoors is 17.21 metres, achieved on 17 January 1999 in Yerevan. Both of these are the Armenian records.

Achievements

See also
Armenian records in athletics

References

External links

1969 births
Living people
Sportspeople from Gyumri
Armenian male triple jumpers
Armenian male long jumpers
Athletes (track and field) at the 1996 Summer Olympics
Athletes (track and field) at the 2000 Summer Olympics
Athletes (track and field) at the 2004 Summer Olympics
Olympic athletes of Armenia
World Athletics Championships athletes for Armenia
Universiade medalists in athletics (track and field)
Universiade silver medalists for Armenia
Medalists at the 1995 Summer Universiade
20th-century Armenian people